Metamorfoses is a book published in 2023 by Brazilian writer Sophia Mendonça. This is the tenth book released by the author. The work focuses on the experiences of people who are both autistic and transgender.

Overview 
Metamorfoses builds affective dialogues between the experiences of the author – transsexual woman, autistic, activist and producer of content about autism – with public posts by transgender autistic people on Twitter. After all, gender incongruence is 7.59 times more common in autistic people than in the general population. However, discussions about autism are rooted in controversies about gender, sexuality and autonomy. Through an affective research perspective, the work discusses the medical and social models of disability and how they articulate with narratives about neurodiversity; reflects on how the narratives that emerge from the characteristics of the autistic person, such as hyperfocus and sensory dysfunctions, talk to gender issues; and dialogues Sophia's unique experience with broader, more collective debates about autism and transgenderism. With regard to unpleasant affects, abjection operates a violent dynamic in relation to trans people.

From December 2020 to June 2021, the author monitored four Twitter pages of autistic trans people, relating the pages to her personal experience. As autism, according to Sophia, affects the communication and interaction of people on the spectrum, Twitter was chosen with the aim of understanding how these people use computer-mediated communication (CMC) and the internet as tools consolidation and sharing of the absence and presence of affective accessibility, that is, of everyday encounters. She says that she observed the public posts of the selected profiles, trying to understand, through the speeches of the posts, aspects that are not easily observable by common sense.

In this book, Mendonça proposes that autism is not a disease to be cured, but a variation of the human condition, a spectrum in which neurologically different people, a social group, are. Another lesson concerns what people usually think about gender transition, as if it were a necessary process for people to perform the gender they identify with. Sophia demonstrates that for those who are transgender, the transition process is only the social confirmation of the gender in which she has always perceived herself since childhood. For this reason, Sophia understood that it was important to give visibility to the processes of autistic and transgender people like her.

Reception 
The master's research that originated the work received the distinction of academic praise at the Federal University of Minas Gerais. Some researchers praised the author's courage in denouncing health professionals with inappropriate practices for trans people, in addition to highlighting the perspective based on the Affective Theory that runs through the entire research.

As of March 1, 2023, the book was among the top 26 bestsellers on Amazon in the Essays and Commentaries on Science category.

References

2023 non-fiction books
Brazilian non-fiction books
Books about autism
Books about autistic women
Books by Sophia Mendonça
Transgender non-fiction books